Claudia Mary Bunge (born 21 September 1999) is a New Zealand footballer who currently plays for Melbourne Victory. She has represented New Zealand at both age group and senior international level.

Club career
Bunge plays club football for Glenfield Rovers, who play in the Lotto NRFL Premier Women's competition. Playing for the Rovers, Bunge has been part of the team to finish runner-up in the 2016 Kate Sheppard Cup that was then known as the Women's Knockout Cup. They then won the Kate Sheppard Cup in 2017. Bunge was also part of the team that won the Lotto NRFL Premier Women league in 2018.

Bunge also plays in the New Zealand Football run National Women's League where teams are run by the regional federations. Bunge plays for and is also currently captain of the Northern Lights.

In November 2020, Bunge joined Melbourne Victory in the Australian W-League.

International career
Bunge was a member of the New Zealand U-17 who won the 2016 OFC U-17 Women's Championship side at the 2016 FIFA U-17 Women's World Cup in Jordan, and the New Zealand U-20 side at the 2018 FIFA U-20 Women's World Cup in France.

Bunge was called up for the New Zealand national team to take part in the Yongchuan International Tournament in China. She made her senior début for the Football Ferns in a 2–0 loss to China on 8 November 2019. She followed up that game with another start for the Ferns against Canada, impressing the coach with her performances.

Career statistics

Club

International

Honours

Club 

Glenfield Rovers:
 Lotto NRFL Premier Women: 2018
 Women's Knockout Cup: 2017

Melbourne Victory
 A-League Women Championship: 2020–21, 2021–22

 International New Zealand U17 OFC U-17s winners: 2016New Zealand U20'''
 OFC U-19s winners: 2017

References

External links

1999 births
Living people
Melbourne Victory FC (A-League Women) players
New Zealand women's association footballers
New Zealand women's international footballers
Women's association football forwards
Footballers at the 2020 Summer Olympics
Olympic association footballers of New Zealand
Expatriate women's soccer players in Australia
New Zealand expatriate sportspeople in Australia
New Zealand expatriate women's association footballers
Australian people of New Zealand descent